The Miles City station of Miles City, Montana is located at 500 Pacific Avenue and was built in 1924.  It was a replacement commissioned to be designed by the Northern Pacific Railway in 1922 despite economic downturn that had reduced prosperity in Miles City.  The station served Miles City for 50 years. The station also served Amtrak's North Coast Hiawatha from 1971 until 1979.

The station was listed on the National Register of Historic Places in 2010, as the Northern Pacific Railway Depot.

References

External links

Miles City, Montana – TrainWeb

Railway stations on the National Register of Historic Places in Montana
Renaissance Revival architecture in Montana
Railway stations in the United States opened in 1924
Buildings and structures in Miles City, Montana
Former Northern Pacific Railway stations
National Register of Historic Places in Custer County, Montana
1924 establishments in Montana
Former Amtrak stations in Montana
Railway stations closed in 1979